This is a list of churches on the island of Lolland in southeastern Denmark.

The list

See also
 List of churches on Bornholm
 List of churches on Falster

References

 
Lolland